Meyer “Mike” Alewitz is an educator, agitprop artist, mural painter, and political activist, working both in the United States and internationally. His use of art to lobby for workers’ rights has fostered numerous controversies. While his passionate and opinionated support for working people has led to the destruction and censoring of his works all over the globe, his approach has been described as “ideally suited to the postmodern and post-state socialist era, when everything rebellious must be created anew and when ‘culture' along with ‘labor’ are urgently needed to salvage a world from eco-disaster, perpetual war, and the plundering of human possibility.”

Early life 
Alewitz was born January 14, 1951, in Cleveland, Ohio, to parents who were active in unions and progressive causes. At the age of four, the family moved to Wilmington, Delaware. There Alewitz grew up in a segregated post-war housing development surrounded by working-class Irish and Italian families.

Alewitz moved back to Cleveland when he was a teenager, and after graduating from Cleveland Heights High School in 1968, he enrolled at Kent State University. While at Kent State he served as a founder and Chairman of the Kent Student Mobilization Committee Against the War in Vietnam (SMC). He was also a columnist for the Daily Kent Stater and was the socialist candidate for student body president at the time of the Kent State shootings in 1970.

Kent State shootings 
On April 30, 1970, U.S. President Richard Nixon, having recently pledged to withdraw 150,000 troops from Vietnam, instead went on television and announced the expansion of American war efforts into Cambodia. At Kent State, as occurred on many college campuses across the country, Nixon’s announcement inspired passionate student protest and clashes with authorities. Ohio Governor James Rhodes sent National Guardsmen to occupy the Kent State campus and restore order, but on May 4, during a student-run anti-war rally, several of the guardsmen fired on protesting students, killing four and wounding nine others.
  
Alewitz was an eyewitness to the shootings, with some of his close friends counted among the victims. In the immediate wake of the tragedy, Alewitz fled campus to avoid arrest but was soon detained by a group of “vigilantes” who pursued the Kent State protestors. Police arrived and arrested Alewitz, who was then barred from returning to the university.
 
After leaving Kent State, Alewitz became a leader of the national student strike that followed the shootings and traveled to Washington, DC, to address a crowd of over 100,000 people at a mass anti-war demonstration on May 9, 1970. Alewitz later served as National Chairman of the Committee of Kent State Massacre Eyewitnesses and was subpoenaed to testify before the Presidential Commission on Campus Unrest (Scranton Commission) where he spoke extensively about the shootings.

Anti-war activity 
Following the tragedy at Kent State, Alewitz moved to Austin, Texas, where he became a leader of the Austin Student Mobilization Committee and the Texas statewide anti-war coalition. His involvement in student outreach to active-duty GIs there led to him being barred from local military bases and placed on the Attorney General’s list of “subversives.”

Labor and socialist activist 
Alewitz joined the Young Socialist Alliance in 1968 and the Socialist Workers Party in 1970. He was active with the group in Texas, Los Angeles, Cleveland, New Orleans, Virginia, Boston and Newark, New Jersey. He served as a member of the SWP until his expulsion in 1987, but remained active in the socialist, anti-war, and labor movements.

During his professional career, Alewitz worked at a variety of jobs, including as a track laborer, railroad clerk, production machinist, and sign painter. His various occupations included membership in such organizations as the Brotherhood of Railroad Clerks, the Brotherhood of Maintenance of Way, International Union of Electrical Workers, Brotherhood of Painters and Allied Trades, United Scenic Artists, and the American Association of University Professors.

Artist and muralist 
Alewitz has traveled throughout the world creating public art on themes of peace and justice. Some of his earlier works included a mural at the Massachusetts College of Art depicting murdered teen Elijah Pate, the seven-story “Pathfinder Mural” in New York’s Greenwich Village, and a mural promoting international worker solidarity at the Southern California Library for Social Studies and Research. His international works include murals commissioned in Baghdad, Chernobyl, Mexico, Nicaragua, Northern Ireland, Israel, the Occupied Territories, and numerous other locations.

In 1999, Alewitz was named a Millennium Artist by the White House Millennium Council, the National Endowment for the Arts, and the Mid-Atlantic Arts Foundation. As a result, he was chosen to execute a highly publicized series of murals painted in Maryland about Harriet Tubman and the Underground Railroad. The central mural, which depicted Tubman carrying a musket, was ultimately rejected by the Associated Black Charities (for whom it was intended) for its controversial association with gun violence.

Alewitz has also organized cultural initiatives for unions and progressive organizations such as the United Mine Workers; Jobs with Justice; Teamsters; Oil, Chemical and Atomic Workers Union; and the United Farm Workers. He taught labor history at Rutgers University, where he was Artist-in-Residence for the NJ Industrial Union Council.
 
From 2000 to 2016, Alewitz was a professor at Central Connecticut State University where he directed a community-based mural painting and street art program. He was the organizer of several annual New Britain International Mural Slams and responsible for establishing a collection of more than one hundred murals at the university.

Red Square 
In 2014, Alewitz was commissioned to paint a mural for the Puffin Gallery of Social Activism at the Museum of the City of New York. The museum refused to install the work due to its political content.

Following the censorship of the Puffin mural, Alewitz established his home in New London, Connecticut, at Red Square, a private studio, gallery, and museum of his agitprop art. Mike Alewitz has spoken and written extensively on political and cultural topics and is the co-author (with Paul Buhle) of Insurgent Images: The Agitprop Murals of Mike Alewitz. His art has also been the subject of documentary films, including 2005’s Breaking Walls, which followed Alewitz on a trip to the Middle East and examined the ways in which his murals have shaped conversations about the role of art in society.

References 

1951 births
Artists from Cleveland
Kent State shootings
Trade unionists from Ohio
Living people
Activists from Cleveland
Members of the Socialist Workers Party (United States)